Asier Olaizola Apezetxea, known as Olaizola I is a pelotari in the first category of hand-pelota.

His brother is pelotari Aimar Olaizola. During his professional career Olaizola won the doubles hand-pelota championships of 1999 and 2001, and earned subchampionships in 2002 and 2007.

Doubles hand-pelota championship finals

References

Spanish pelotaris
1975 births
Living people
People from Norte de Aralar
Pelotaris from Navarre